227 is an American sitcom television series that originally aired on NBC from September 14, 1985, to May 6, 1990. The series stars Marla Gibbs as Mary Jenkins, a sharp-tongued, city resident gossip and housewife. Other main characters include her husband Lester (Hal Williams), their daughter Brenda (Regina King), landlady Rose Holloway (Alaina Reed Hall), and neighbors Sandra Clark (Jackée Harry) and Pearl Shay (Helen Martin).

Origins
The series was adapted from a play written in 1978 by Christine Houston about the lives of women in a predominantly black apartment building in 1950s Chicago. The setting of the series, however, was changed to present-day Washington, D.C. The show was created as a starring vehicle for Marla Gibbs, who had become famous as Florence Johnston, the maid on The Jeffersons, and had starred in Houston's play in Los Angeles. This role was similar in nature to that of tart-tongued Florence; Gibbs' character, housewife Mary Jenkins, loved a good gossip and often spoke what she thought, with sometimes not-so-favorable results.

According to Gibbs, 227 was originally offered to ABC but sold to NBC. Since The Jeffersons was still on the air on CBS, the new show was scheduled to begin in 1986. However, when The Jeffersons was abruptly and unexpectedly canceled in 1985, Gibbs was free to begin, and 227 went into production a year earlier than had been previously planned.

Synopsis
227 followed the lives of people in a middle-class apartment building, 227 Lexington Place (the numerical address from which the sitcom's name comes), in Northeast, Washington, D.C. The show was centered around Mary Jenkins (Marla Gibbs), a nosy and tart-tongued but loving housewife. Her husband, Lester (Hal Williams), had his own construction company, and their daughter, Brenda (Regina King, in her first television acting role), was boy-crazy yet smart and studious.

Also cast in 227 was Sandra Clark (Jackée Harry), Mary's younger neighbor who constantly bickered back and forth with her about their respective views on life. While Mary was a happily married housewife with a stable lifestyle, Sandra was a stylish, loose, man-hungry, somewhat ditzy diva, and a serial dater who dressed provocatively. Although their relationship was antagonistic at first, Mary and Sandra became good friends as time went on. Also living in the building was Pearl Shay (Helen Martin), a feisty but kind-hearted busybody neighbor who was known for snooping and had a sharp sense of humor. Pearl had a grandson named Calvin Dobbs (Curtis Baldwin), whom Brenda had a crush on and would finally date later in the series' run.

Rose Lee Holloway (Alaina Reed Hall) was Mary's level-headed best friend and often the voice of reason among 227's residents. She and Mary were often seen sitting on the front stoop of the building, exchanging rumors and gossip, with Pearl adding sly commentary and humor from her front window. Rose had a daughter named Tiffany (Kia Goodwin), who was Brenda's closest friend, but the child actor's mother was unhappy in California, so she was let out of her contract and written out of the series after the second season, although she was mentioned occasionally. In the premiere episode, Rose became the unexpected landlord of the building after the building's stingy slumlord Mr. Calloway died. Rose stayed on as landlady until the fourth season (for season five, Paul Winfield was introduced as the building's new snide, wealthy landlord Julian C. Barlow).

In the first season, both Helen Martin and Curtis Baldwin, who had only been recurring stars, appeared in nearly every episode. From season 2 onward, they were upped to series regulars. 

By the time taping started on the third season in 1987, Jackée Harry, who had just won an Emmy for Outstanding Supporting Actress, changed her stage name to simply Jackée, which she used until 1994. In the fourth season, an 11-year-old child prodigy named Alexandria DeWitt (Countess Vaughn) became the Jenkinses' houseguest. Vaughn received her role after she appeared on Star Search and declared to host Ed McMahon that her favorite show was 227. However, Alexandria left during Calvin's graduation episode near the end of season four to reunite with her father, who, after completing his archaeological dig in the Amazon, had moved to London to catalogue his items.

After the fourth season, Jackée's television pilot, titled "Jackée", found Sandra moving to New York City and finding work at a spa. NBC aired the episode on May 11, 1989. The pilot was rejected, and Jackée left the show; however, she was a guest star in seven of the final season's episodes.

In the show's final season, Toukie Smith, Barry Sobel, Stoney Jackson, Kevin Peter Hall, and Paul Winfield joined the cast in an effort to stop the show's declining ratings. In the end, the cast additions proved fruitless, and 227 ended its run in the spring of 1990.

Cast

Episodes

Ratings
With the exception of The Cosby Show and A Different World, 227 achieved higher ratings than other sitcoms airing at the time with a predominantly African-American cast during the first two seasons of its original run on NBC.
 1985–1986: #20 (18.80 rating)
 1986–1987: #14 (18.90 rating)
 1987–1988: #27 (16.44 rating)
 1988–1989: #35 (14.47 rating)
 1989–1990: #60 (11.53 rating)

Awards and nominations

Series syndication
NBC aired daytime reruns of 227 from September 1989 to July 1990. The show went into syndication in the fall of 1990. It has previously aired on cable's BET, TV One, TV Land, Centric, and UP (formerly GMC). Selected minisodes from the first season are available to view for free on Crackle. 227 (alongside Amen) aired on Encore Black from November 12, 2013, to November 30, 2015. The show is owned and distributed by Sony Pictures Television. 227 aired back-to-back episodes on Logo starting at midnight on New Year's Day 2016. In January 2017, the series began airing on Antenna TV; in 2021 it began airing on sister network Rewind TV. The series started airing on OWN weekend nights starting December 2, 2017.

In Canada, 227 is available online, broadcast, and on demand by CTV. In the UK, the series has previously aired on BBC One, Sky One, ITV, Sky Living and Channel 4.

The series became available to stream on Amazon Prime Video on July 15, 2021 and on Hulu on May 23, 2022.

Home media
On September 28, 2004, Columbia TriStar Home Entertainment released the complete first season of 227 on DVD in Region 1.

On February 7, 2017, Mill Creek Entertainment re-released the first season on DVD in Region 1.

References

External links 
 
 

1985 American television series debuts
1990 American television series endings
1980s American sitcoms
1980s American black sitcoms
1990s American black sitcoms
English-language television shows
NBC original programming
Primetime Emmy Award-winning television series
Television series about families
Television series based on plays
Television series by Sony Pictures Television
Television shows set in Washington, D.C.